Market Square Historic District is a national historic district located in the Black Rock neighborhood of Buffalo in Erie County, New York. The district encompasses 15 contributing buildings and 1 contributing site in a mixed residential and commercial section of Buffalo.  The district developed between about 1830 and 1912, and includes a buildings in a variety of architectural styles including Federal, Gothic Revival, Italianate, Queen Anne, Romanesque Revival, and Bungalow / American Craftsman.  Located in the district is the separately listed St. Francis Xavier Roman Catholic Parish Complex.  Other notable contributing resources include the Market Square (1830), Black Rock Savings and Loan (1870-1910), Firehouse Engine #15 (1912), Smith House and Tavern (c. 1830-1835), St. John's Church (1894), and Howell House and Store (c. 1830, c. 1910).

It was listed on the National Register of Historic Places in 2011.

References

Historic districts on the National Register of Historic Places in New York (state)
Federal architecture in New York (state)
Gothic Revival architecture in New York (state)
Italianate architecture in New York (state)
Queen Anne architecture in New York (state)
Romanesque Revival architecture in New York (state)
Buildings and structures in Buffalo, New York
Historic districts in Buffalo, New York
National Register of Historic Places in Buffalo, New York